One Droopy Knight is a 1957 animated short subject in the Droopy series, directed by Michael Lah and produced by William Hanna and Joseph Barbera for Metro-Goldwyn-Mayer in CinemaScope.

Plot 
Essentially a remake of 1949's Señor Droopy, but taking place in a medieval setting rather than the country of Mexico, One Droopy Knight casts Droopy and his rival Butch as medieval knights out to slay a dragon and win the hand of a beautiful human princess. However, the dragon considers both as nothing more than minor nuisances. Droopy, though, takes more chances to slay the dragon, but it thinks Droopy is small and harmless. Meanwhile, Butch is being foiled after being molded into a metal can.

Droopy, however, bangs a flail on the dragon's tail and says, "Take that, you no-good dragon!" Once again, the dragon single-handedly flicks Droopy away. Butch comes back riding on a steed. Suddenly, the dragon blows fire on Butch and the horse, leaving them naked.

Butch gives up and goes away, while Droopy stands and cries looking at a picture of the princess. The dragon draws a French moustache on the photo and laughs outrageously. Droopy calmly gets mad and says "Mr. Dragon, that makes me mad." Then, he beats up the dragon and wins the heart of the princess. Finally, at the palace, Droopy reads the ending of the story of the dragon and closes the book. He kisses the princess's hand, then takes up a cigar to show her about smoking, and Droopy gives the cigar a blow, the dragon comes up, and breathes fire on it. The result is smoke coming out from the cigar when Droopy smokes it before revealing this to the princess.

Reception 
It was nominated for an Academy Award for Best Animated Short Film in 1958, but lost to Birds Anonymous, a Sylvester & Tweety cartoon from Warner Bros.

References

External links 

One Droppy Knight on MUBI

1950s American animated films
1957 animated films
1957 short films
Animated films about dragons
Droopy
1950s English-language films
Films scored by Scott Bradley
Films directed by Michael Lah
Films set in the Middle Ages
Metro-Goldwyn-Mayer animated short films
Metro-Goldwyn-Mayer cartoon studio short films
American animated short films
Metro-Goldwyn-Mayer short films
Animated films about dogs